In commercial shipping, laytime  is the amount of time allowed in a voyage charter for the loading and unloading of cargo.

Under a voyage charter or time charter, the shipowner is responsible for operating the vessel, and the master and crew are the employees of the shipowner, not the charterer. However, once the vessel has "arrived" at a port the charterer then assumes responsibility for the loading and unloading of cargo, having a period of laytime in which to carry this out. (Note that the actual loading may be performed by a third-party stevedore).

The moment when laytime commences is determined by a Notice of Readiness (or "NOR"), which the master or agent of the ship must give to the port when the ship has arrived at the port of loading or discharge. The charterparty contract determines the precise meaning of "arrival". Usually, "arrival" is when the ship has arrived at the port and is ready in all respects to load or discharge; but it may be, say, when the ship has passed buoy #2 in the approach channel, or once the vessel has pass through lock gates.

If the charterer does not comply with the NOR, the carrier may cancel the contract and seek damages. If the charterer's delay means that laytime is exceeded, a predetermined penalty (i.e. liquidated damages) called "demurrage" is incurred. If the whole period of laytime is not needed, a refund called "despatch" may be payable by the shipowner to the charterer. Despatch is normally paid at 50% of the demurrage rate, but this depends on the terms of the charterparty.  The ship may thus be able to leave port early. Despatch does not normally apply to tanker charters.

"Laytime" should not be confused with "Laydays" because "Laydays" is the period within which the Shipowner has to make the vessel "ready" to the Charterer at the place and time agreed in the charter party. "Cancelling Date" is the last day of "Laydays" and acts as a deadline to tender "Notice of Readiness". A ship (vessel) failing to become an "Arrived Ship" by tendering a valid Notice of Readiness, bears the risk of being refused/cancelled by Charterers as per Charter-Party provisions.

References

External links

Further reading 
Todd, Paul (1988) Contracts for the carriage of Goods by Sea, page 88, BSP Professional Books, Oxford, U.K ISBN

Ship chartering